Jiang Shusheng (born April 1940 in Wuxi, Jiangsu) is a Chinese physicist and politician. He served as President of Nanjing University from 1997 to 2006. He was, from 2005 to 2012, chairman of the China Democratic League, a legally recognized non-Communist party in China. He served as the Vice Chairman of the Standing Committee of the National People's Congress from 2008 to 2013.

References

1940 births
Living people
Chairpersons of the China Democratic League
Educators from Wuxi
Nanjing University alumni
People's Republic of China politicians from Jiangsu
Physicists from Jiangsu
Politicians from Wuxi
Presidents of Nanjing University
Scientists from Wuxi
Vice Chairpersons of the National People's Congress